Muger may refer to:
Muger River, in central Ethiopia
Muger Cement, a football team in Ethiopia
Muger, Iran (disambiguation), villages in Kohgiluyeh and Boyer-Ahmad Province, Iran